"Love Letters in the Sand" is a popular song first published in 1931. The music was written by J. Fred Coots and the lyrics by Nick Kenny and Charles Kenny. Ted Black and His Orchestra, with vocalist Tom Brown, had the first major hit recording of the song in 1931. Pat Boone had a major hit with the song in 1957.

Pat Boone version

Pat Boone's version became a major hit in June and July 1957, spending 5 weeks at number one on the Billboard Top 100, with 34 weeks in total on the chart. Billboard ranked it as the No. 2 song for 1957. In Canada, the song spent two weeks at number one. The song was used in Boone's 1957 film Bernardine. Boone did the whistling in the instrumental portion of the song as well. The song originally had a short instrumental introduction, but most versions begin with Boone's voice.

Charts

Other versions
In 1931, the song was recorded separately by Gene Austin, Lee Morse, and American dance band Ted Black and His Orchestra, with "Vocal refrain by Tom Brown".
Kenneth W. Griffin also released an organ discography in 1957, featuring the song, in his album, "Love Letters in the Sand".
Johnny Dorelli recorded a Jazz version on his 1957 album “Dance With...” 
Bob Eberly released a version on his Spanish-oriented album Bob Eberly Con Enoch Light Y Su Orquesta in 1957, sung in English but subtitled Cartas De Amor En La Arena.
Andy Williams released a version on his 1959 album, Two Time Winners. 
Bill Haley and His Comets recorded a version on the 1960 covers album Bill Haley and His Comets. 
Leroy Van Dyke released a version on his 1961 album, Movin' Van Dyke.
Sonny James on his 1964 album You're the Only World I Know which reached No. 2 on the US Country charts.
The English singer, Vince Hill, reached No. 23 in the UK Singles Chart in 1967, with his cover version of the track.
Marie Osmond on her 1975 album Who's Sorry Now which reached No. 20 on the US Country charts.
Tom T. Hall's version reached No. 79 on the U.S. Country chart in 1986.
Little Willie Littlefield recorded a version for his 1990 album Singalong with Little Willie Littlefield.
Sixpence None the Richer recorded a version for their 1996 album Tickets for a Prayer Wheel.

See also
List of number-one singles in Australia during the 1950s
List of Top 25 singles for 1957 in Australia
List of Billboard number-one singles of 1957
Billboard year-end top 50 singles of 1957
List of Cash Box Best Sellers number-one singles of 1957
List of CHUM number-one singles of 1957

References

External links
 

1931 songs
1957 singles
Songs with music by John Frederick Coots
Songs with lyrics by Nick Kenny (poet)
Songs with lyrics by Charles Kenny
Pat Boone songs
Andy Williams songs
Little Willie Littlefield songs
Number-one singles in Australia
Number-one singles in the United States
Billboard Top 100 number-one singles